Christiania Burgher School (Christiania Borger- og Realskole or Christiania Borgerskole, commonly known as Borgerskolen) was a private middle school in Christiania (now Oslo), Norway. It was founded in 1812 and prepared pupils for enrolment at Oslo Cathedral School.

The school was funded by tuition and throughout the 19th century, its pupils belonged to affluent families, such as the bourgeoisie and higher state officials. In the 20th century, the school received municipal subsidies and thus also pupils from less affluent backgrounds were able to attend. The school was closed down in 1932.

References

1812 establishments in Norway
1932 disestablishments in Norway
Educational institutions established in 1812
Educational institutions disestablished in 1932
Schools in Oslo
Secondary schools in Norway
History of Oslo